Dust is a 2012 Guatemalan drama film directed by Julio Hernández Cordón.

Cast
 Alejandra Estrada
 Fernando Martínez as Vecino
 Agustin Ortíz Pérez
 Eduardo Spiegeler
 María Telón

References

External links
 

2012 films
Guatemalan drama films
2010s Spanish-language films
2012 drama films